Efatese is an artificial mixed language or zonal auxiliary language of Efate Island in Vanuatu. There are half a dozen languages spoken on Efate, of which the languages of North Efate and South Efate are not particularly closely related, and when missionary activity began on the island, at Port Havannah in the northwest of the island, a mixture of the target languages was invented for evangelism and scripture, in preference to promoting one indigenous language over the others.

References

Robert Henry Codrington (1885) "Fate, Sandwich Islands", in The Melanesian Languages, 471–476. Oxford: Clarendon Press.
Daniel MacDonald (1889) "Grammar of the Efatese language", in Daniel MacDonald (ed.), Three New Hebrides Languages (Efatese, Eromangan, Santo), 1–58. Melbourne: Edgerton and Moore.

Zonal constructed languages
Central Vanuatu languages
Constructed languages introduced in the 19th century